Edward Carrington (February 11, 1748 – October 28, 1810) was an American soldier and statesman from Virginia. During the American Revolutionary War he became a lieutenant colonel of artillery in the Continental Army. He distinguished himself as quartermaster general in General Nathanael Greene’s southern campaign. He commanded artillery at Monmouth and Yorktown. He was also present at Cowpens, Guilford Court House, and Hobkirk's Hill. During the war he became a close friend of George Washington. Carrington served in the 3rd Continental Congress and was the first US Marshal appointed from his state. He was an original member of the Society of the Cincinnati.

Family
Edward Carrington was born on February 11, 1748, on Boston Hill Plantation near the town of Cartersville in old Goochland County, Virginia, later split off into Cumberland County, Virginia. He was the eighth of the 11 children of George Carrington and Anne Mayo. His father George arrived in Virginia in 1727 from Barbados and married Anne around 1732 when he was 21 and she was 20. Edward's oldest brother Paul Carrington became an eminent jurist.

Edward married Elizabeth Jaquelin Ambler Brent Carrington (1765–1842) and the couple had no children. He was Elizabeth's second husband; her first husband William Brent died. She co-founded the Female Humane Association around 1805 to aid homeless girls and young women, it is now known as the Memorial Foundation for Children.

Revolutionary War

1775–1777
Carrington studied the law and opened a law practice. He also managed a plantation in southern Virginia. In 1775–76 he became a member of the Goochland County Revolutionary Committee. On December 1, 1775, the state of Virginia established an artillery company. On February 13, 1776, the state authorities appointed James Innes the captain and Charles Harrison, Samuel Denney, and Carrington as lieutenants. the Continental Congress accepted the artillery unit into the Continental Army on March 19 and requested a second company from Virginia to be formed. Innes soon transferred to the infantry.

In late 1776, George Washington ordered his artillery chief Henry Knox to begin organizing three artillery regiments to support the Continental Army. Harrison's Continental Artillery Regiment was authorized on 26 November 1776 and assigned to the Southern Department. The regiment was to expand from the two existing companies to a total of ten companies. Harrison was appointed the regiment's colonel while Carrington became lieutenant colonel and second in command. Each company consisted of four officers, one sergeant, four corporals, four bombardiers, eight gunners, and 48 matrosses. The regiment garrisoned Virginia during 1777.

1778–1780
On March 13, 1778, Harrison's Regiment was transferred to the main army. Carrington performed with distinction in the Battle of Monmouth on June 28. Beginning in the early afternoon and continuing for two hours, 10–14 American field guns dueled with eight British cannons and two howitzers. Carrington's guns were placed on the American left flank under William Alexander, Lord Stirling's command. On August 10, 1779, Harrison's Regiment was renamed the 1st Continental Artillery Regiment. In March 1780, Carrington served with Arthur St. Clair, and Alexander Hamilton as commissioners for a prisoner exchange.

On April 17, 1780, the 1st Artillery Regiment was assigned to the Southern Department. Carrington was sent south in command of three artillery companies with Johann de Kalb's forces. Harrison unexpectedly joined De Kalb and assumed command of the gunners when the force reached North Carolina, leaving Carrington unemployed. On July 25, Horatio Gates superseded De Kalb in command and gave Carrington a new assignment. Gates ordered him to investigate the best points to cross the Roanoke River for supplying the American forces and finding the best retreat routes. The American army led by Gates was smashed in the Battle of Camden on August 16, 1780.

Nathanael Greene assumed command of the American southern army on December 3. The new leader ordered Carrington to continue reconnoitering possible routes of withdrawal, an action that historian Mark M. Boatner III wrote would "prove decisive". Greene split his army into three parts: 600 led by Daniel Morgan, 1,100 under Isaac Huger at Cheraw, South Carolina, and light troops commanded by "Light Horse" Harry Lee. Greene appointed Carrington the quartermaster general. At that time there was no money in the military chest, yet the army was kept supplied. Among his new duties was an examination of the Dan River which is the southern branch of the Roanoke. Lee later wrote a glowing account of Carrington's successful execution of this duty.

1781–1783
Historian Boatner believed that, "this advance planning enabled Carrington to propose a course of action that probably saved the Southern army". On January 17, 1781, in the Battle of Cowpens, an 1,100-man American force under Morgan wrecked an equal-sized British force led by Banastre Tarleton. The Americans inflicted losses of 100 killed, 229 wounded, and 600 captured on the British while reporting only 12 killed and 60 wounded. Carrington was present at the battle. Sending his column of prisoners to Virginia, Morgan quickly left the scene of his stunning triumph and raced to join Greene's forces. Greene realized that Lord Charles Cornwallis would soon be after Morgan with the main British army. He decided to retreat toward Virginia in the hope that Cornwallis would follow. Greene ordered Carrington to assemble boats on the Dan River and instructed his separate columns under Morgan, Lee, and Huger to head north for a rendezvous.

On February 1, 1781, Tarleton's cavalry crossed the Catawba River and dispersed the North Carolina militia in actions at Cowan's Ford and Torrence's Tavern. On February 2, Morgan found boats waiting for him at Trading Ford on the Yadkin River; that night his troops crossed. On February 7, Morgan, Huger, and Lee rendezvoused at Guilford Court House, North Carolina. At this time, both Greene and Cornwallis were roughly the same distance from Dix's Ferry on the Dan River. The proposal was adopted and Carrington arranged to move the boats to the downstream crossings. A 700-man rearguard was organized to hold off Cornwallis. Since Morgan insisted on leaving the army on account of his health, Otho Williams assumed command of the rearguard.

On February 10, Greene's army left Guilford Court House and marched toward the two crossings suggested by Carrington,  to the northeast. For two days, Williams succeeded in blocking Cornwallis from finding out the true direction of Greene's retreat. By the morning of February 13, Tarleton had determined Greene's real line of retreat. Sending his vanguard on the same road to deceive the Americans, Cornwallis suddenly shifted his main body to a road farther east. Carrington's boats were now all at Irwin's and Boyd's ferries, so he took command of the cavalry detachment watching the British vanguard. Carrington noted that the British vanguard had slowed down and this, combined with other intelligence, confirmed Cornwallis' change of direction. Both armies raced along with hardly a rest, the Americans trying to reach Boyd's Ferry and hold back their foes while the British tried to overrun them. At noon on February 14, Williams received a welcome message from Greene that the American main body had crossed the Dan and was safely on the north bank. At 9 pm, the last American cavalry crossed the Dan at Boyd's Ferry with Lee and Carrington in the last boat. Blocked by high water and lacking boats, Cornwallis pulled back to Hillsborough, North Carolina.

Carrington was present at the Battle of Guilford Court House a few weeks later. On April 19, Greene's army approached the British force under Lord Francis Rawdon at Camden, South Carolina. Deciding that Rawdon's defenses were too strong, Greene took up a position on Hobkirk's Hill to the north of Camden. When Greene returned to Hobkirk's Hill on 24 April, Rawdon received intelligence that the Americans were without artillery and low on food. On the morning of April 25, 1781, Carrington arrived in the American camp with the artillery and provisions. That day, Rawdon advanced and won the Battle of Hobkirk's Hill, but during its early stages he was unpleasantly surprised when Harrison's three 6-pound cannons suddenly opened fire.

In July 1781, Greene granted Carrington leave to try to fill the vacancy in the 4th Continental Artillery Regiment after Thomas Proctor resigned in April. Greene filled the quartermaster general position with a deputy in case Carrington returned. During the Siege of Yorktown, Carrington, Ebenezer Stevens, and John Lamb rotated responsibility as Henry Knox's chief assistant. It is not clear if Carrington exercised direct command over Whitehead Coleman's company of the 1st Artillery or the three companies of the 4th Artillery present at Yorktown. Since he never received promotion, Carrington resumed his post as quartermaster general under Greene in the summer of 1782 and served in that capacity until the end of the war.

Later career
Carrington served as treasurer at the first meeting of Virginia's Society of the Cincinnati on October 9, 1783. During the war, Carrington became a friend and confidant of George Washington. Virginia sent Carrington as a delegate to the Continental Congress from 1786 to 1788. (Boatner states that it was 1785–1787.) He often visited Washington at Mount Vernon during this period. After being elected president, Washington appointed Carrington as the first U.S. Marshal for Virginia, a position he held from 1789 until March 1791. He then served as Virginia's supervisor of the revenue from 1791 to 1794. The new president often sought Carrington's advice on political matters. During his second term, President Washington offered Carrington the posts of Attorney General and Secretary of War, which were declined.

In 1797, Washington wrote a letter to Carrington stating that he had just hosted the future Supreme Court Justice John Marshall. He noted that Marshall approved of an improved threshing machine by a Mr. Booker. Washington wrote that he was sending a letter to Booker and asked that Carrington forward it to that individual. In 1798, President John Adams selected Carrington to be the quartermaster general for the United States Army during the Quasi-War with France, but the position was never filled and was eliminated when normal relations were restored. In 1807, Carrington was foreman of the jury during Aaron Burr's treason trial. His brother-in-law John Marshall was the presiding judge and Burr was acquitted.

Carrington died on October 28, 1810, at Richmond, Virginia. 
In 1775, while listening to Patrick Henry's famous "Give me liberty, or give me death!" speech while standing outside a window at St. John's Church where the speech was given, he turned to his friends and whispered, "Boys, bury me here, in this very spot!" Per his wishes, he is buried just outside that window.

See also

Notes

References

1748 births
1810 deaths
Continental Army officers from Virginia
Continental Army staff officers
Continental Congressmen from Virginia
18th-century American politicians
Quartermasters
Virginia colonial people
United States Marshals